Pau Sans López (born 24 November 2004) is a Spanish footballer who plays as a forward for Deportivo Aragón.

Club career
Born in Zaragoza, Aragon, Sans joined Real Zaragoza's youth setup from UD Amistad. He made his senior debut with the reserves on 5 February 2023, playing the last eight minutes in a 1–1 Segunda Federación home draw against CD Teruel.

Sans made his first team debut on 11 February 2023, coming on as a second-half substitute for fellow youth graduate Miguel Puche in a 4–1 Segunda División home loss against Deportivo Alavés.

Career statistics

Club

References

External links

2004 births
Living people
Footballers from Zaragoza
Spanish footballers
Association football forwards
Segunda División players
Segunda Federación players
Real Zaragoza B players
Real Zaragoza players